The 2010 ICC Women's World Twenty20 was the second ICC Women's World Twenty20 competition, which was held in the West Indies from 5 to 16 May 2010. The group stage matches were played at the Warner Park Sporting Complex on Saint Kitts. It was won by Australia, who defeated New Zealand in the final. New Zealand's Nicola Browne was named as Player of the Tournament.

Groups

Matches

Group stage

Group A

Group B

Knockout stage

Semi-finals

Final

After Australia captain Alex Blackwell elected to bat, New Zealand started effectively. Their opening fast bowler Nicola Browne bowled her quota of four overs straight through, taking 2/11. She removed opener Elyse Villani, for six, caught at cover. Blackwell was then out for 0, cutting into the hands of Sophie Devine in the gully. Shelley Nitschke had earlier been trapped leg before wicket by Sian Ruck for three. This was following by a partnership of 30 between Leah Poulton and Jess Cameron, but they were unable to lift the run rate substantially; their stand took 45 balls. Poulton was out trying to loft a ball over cover, and two balls later, Cameron was bowled from Kate Broadmore's first ball, leaving Australia at 5/51 in the 13th over. Only Poulton managed a solitary boundary. Wicket-keeper Alyssa Healy scored 10 from as many balls, but was then run out attempting a second run after being dropped by Sara McGlashan.

The total was boosted by Sarah Elliott, who made 19 not out from 20 balls, and Lisa Sthalekar (18 off 13), putting on 27 from 22 balls. Sthalekar was bowled by Devine after moving across outside off stump and trying to paddle scoop the ball down to fine leg. The innings ended with a one-handed catch by New Zealand captain Aimee Watkins, who leapt high at cover to prevent a drive from Rene Farrell going for four.

New Zealand started their chase solidly. Suzie Bates pulled the first ball of the innings for two and hit a six over long-on in the second over, bowled by Rene Farrell. However, in the fourth over, but Watkins' pull from the bowling of Clea Smith was taken by a leaping Blackwell at midwicket. In the next over Blackwell ran out McGlashan for 1, after the latter had been in a mix-up with Bates, leaving New Zealand at 2/19. In the next over Bates tried to pull Ellyse Perry down the ground and was caught by Elliott, who ran across from mid-off. The following over, Perry uprooted Amy Satterthwaite's off stump with a ball that kept low and New Zealand were in trouble at 4/29 in the seventh over.

For the next 21 balls, the new batters Devine and Rachel Priest struggled to score, accumulating only seven runs in this period. At this time, the spin of Nitschke (1/10) and Sthalekar (0/19) contained the New Zealand batting. During this phase, Priest was given out stumped by Healy after the television umpire Asad Rauf had pressed the wrong button and had to retract his decision. Soon after she hit Nitschke to Blackwell and New Zealand were at 5/36 after 11 overs, leaving them with 71 runs to score from the last 54 balls.

This brought Browne to the crease and she put on 41 from as many balls in partnership with Devine, who ended with 38 not out from 35 balls. However, they could not score quickly, with a total of only two fours and one six. In the 18th over, Browne was caught behind for 20 from Perry. Devine hit a four and a six from the last two balls of the 19th over bowled by Farrell to leave New Zealand requiring 14 runs from the last over, which Perry bowled.

A single from the first ball put Devine on strike, and she hit four consecutive twos. Devine required five runs from the last ball to win and she struck a powerful straight drive. Perry, who has played football for Australia, stuck out her right foot and the ball deflected to mid-on where Sthalekar stopped the ball and only one run was scored. This sealed an Australian win by three runs. Perry was named the player of the match for her 3/18.

Statistics

Most runs

Source: ESPNCricinfo

Most wickets

Source: ESPNCricinfo

References

External links
 ICC Women's World Twenty20 2010 from Cricinfo

 
International cricket competitions in 2010
2010 in women's cricket
2010 in West Indian cricket
International women's cricket competitions in the West Indies
May 2010 sports events in North America